Florida's 4th House District elects one member of the Florida House of Representatives. The district is represented by Patt Maney. This district is located in the Florida Panhandle, and encompasses part of the Emerald Coast, as well as part of the Crestview metropolitan area. The district covers southern Okaloosa County. The largest city in the district is Crestview. As of the 2010 Census, the district's population is 158,781.

This district contains Northwest Florida State College, located in Niceville. The district also contains Destin–Fort Walton Beach Airport, as well as Eglin Air Force Base.

There was a vacancy between February 21, 2010 and April 13, 2010 as the incumbent, Ray Sansom, resigned due to a corruption scandal. Lawyer Matt Gaetz won a special election to fill the seat.

Ray Sansom served as Speaker of the Florida House of Representatives from 2008 to 2009.

Representatives from 1967 to the present

See also 

 Florida's 1st Senate district
 Florida's 2nd Senate district
 Florida's 1st congressional district

References 

04
Okaloosa County, Florida